Golden Eagle Award for Best Television Series (Chinese name:中国电视金鹰奖最佳电视连续剧) is a main category of the Golden Eagle Awards. The Best Television Series is given to one drama, while the other nominated works are recognised as Outstanding Television Series. This category was absent in 2016.

Winners list

2020s

2010s

2000s

1990s

References

External links
Past Winners of Golden Eagles

Chinese television awards
Television Series